Armando Castagna (born 22 September 1963) is a former Italian international motorcycle speedway rider. He was born in Arzignano, and was a member of the Italy national team and has represented them in several World Team Cup competitions. He is a record 12 times Italian Champion.

Career
He rode in the United Kingdom for the Ipswich Witches and Oxford Cheetahs but he spent the majority of his career with the Reading Racers where he won the British League title twice. 

He has ridden in the Speedway Grand Prix series and has reached five Speedway World Championship finals. On 26 July 1997 he won the Continental Final, which formed part of the 1998 Speedway Grand Prix Qualification.

He won the Italian National Championship a record twelve times and in 1999, he won the Argentine Championship.

World final appearances

Individual World Championship
 1985 -  Bradford, Odsal Stadium - 13th - 4pts
 1986 -  Chorzów, Silesian Stadium - 15th - 2pts
 1990 -  Bradford, Odsal Stadium - 8th - 8pts
 1991 -  Göteborg, Ullevi - 11th - 6pts
 1993 -  Pocking, Rottalstadion - 12th - 5pts

World Pairs Championship
 1984 -  Lonigo, Pista Speedway (with Armando Dal Chiele) - 7th - 6pts (5)
 1986 -  Pocking, Rottalstadion (with Valentino Furlanetto) - 8th - 15pts (8)
 1987 -  Pardubice, Svítkov Stadion (with Valentino Furlanetto) - 8th - 18pts
 1988 -  Bradford, Odsal Stadium (with Valentino Furlanetto) - 7th - 21pts
 1991 -  Poznań, Olimpia Poznań Stadium (with Valentino Furlanetto / Fabrizio Vesprini) - 6th - 10pts
 1992 -  Lonigo, Pista Speedway (with Valentino Furlanetto / Armando Dal Chiele) - 4th - 18pts

Retirement
Since retiring in 2001, Castagna took charge of speedway in Italy and was the Italia national team manager.

At its meeting on Friday 22 February 2013, the FIM Board of Directors appointed new Directors and new members in various Commissions.  Armando was appointed as new Director of the FIM Track Racing Commission (CCP), succeeding Roy Otto.

Family
His son Michele Paco Castagna is a speedway rider and Italian champion.

References

1963 births
Living people
Italian speedway riders
Sportspeople from Vicenza
Ipswich Witches riders
Reading Racers riders
Oxford Cheetahs riders